"The Aleph" (original Spanish title: "El Aleph") is a short story by the Argentine writer and poet Jorge Luis Borges. First published in September 1945, it was reprinted in the  short story collection, The Aleph and Other Stories,  in 1949, and revised by the author in 1974.

Plot summary

In Borges' story, the Aleph is a point in space that contains all other points. Anyone who gazes into it can see everything in the universe from every angle simultaneously, without distortion, overlapping, or confusion. The story traces the theme of infinity found in several of Borges' other works, such as "The Book of Sand". Borges has stated that the inspiration for this story came from H.G. Wells's short story The Door in the Wall.

As in many of Borges' short stories, the protagonist is a fictionalized version of the author. At the beginning of the story, he is mourning the recent death of Beatriz Viterbo, a woman  he loved, and he resolves to stop by the house of her family to pay his respects. Over time, he comes to know her first cousin, Carlos Argentino Daneri, a mediocre poet with a vastly exaggerated view of his own talent who has made it his lifelong quest to write an epic poem that describes every single location on the planet in excruciatingly fine detail.

Later in the story, a business attempts to tear down Daneri's house in the course of its expansion. Daneri becomes enraged, explaining to the narrator that he must keep the house in order to finish his poem, because the cellar contains an Aleph which he is using to write the poem. Though by now he believes Daneri to be insane, the narrator proposes without waiting for an answer to come to the house and see the Aleph for himself.

Left alone in the darkness of the cellar, the narrator begins to fear that Daneri is conspiring to kill him, and then he sees the Aleph for himself:

Though staggered by the experience of seeing the Aleph, the narrator pretends to have seen nothing in order to get revenge on Daneri, whom he dislikes, by giving Daneri a reason to doubt his own sanity. The narrator tells Daneri that Daneri has lived too long amongst the noise and bustle of the city and spent too much time in the dark and enclosed space of his cellar, and the narrator assures him that what he truly needs are the wide open spaces and fresh air of the countryside, and these will provide him with the true peace of mind that he needs to complete his poem. He then takes his leave of Daneri and exits the house.

In a postscript to the story, Borges explains that Daneri's house was ultimately demolished, but that Daneri himself won second place for the Argentine National Prize for Literature. He also states his belief that the Aleph in Daneri's house was "a false Aleph". Borges then defends this claim by citing many similar instances where objects were inaccurately perceived to be Alephs. For Cantor's Mengenlehre Aleph is the symbol of transfinite numbers, of which any part is as great as the whole as, for example, in the mathematical paradoxes of infinity: in a segment there are as many points as in the straight line that contains it, or even numbers are infinite like all numbers. Another example is a report written by "Captain Burton" (Richard Francis Burton) when he was British consul in Brazil, describing the Mosque of Amr in Cairo, within which there is said to be a stone pillar that contains the entire universe; although this Aleph cannot be seen, it is said that those who put their ear to the pillar can hear a continuous hum that symbolizes all the concurrent noises of the universe heard at any given time. Ultimately, Borges claims that all the instances described were "merely optical instruments" rather than true Alephs.

References

External links

1945 short stories
Short stories by Jorge Luis Borges
Fantasy short stories
Short stories about writers
Works originally published in Sur (magazine)
Mathematics and culture
Buenos Aires in fiction
Fray Bentos in fiction
Novels set in Buenos Aires
Argentine speculative fiction works